Silvano Contini (born 15 January 1958) is an Italian former professional road bicycle racer.

Career
Professional from 1978 to 1990, his main successes were the 1982 Liège–Bastogne–Liège of 1982, the 1985 Grand Prix du Midi Libre and the 1981 Tour of the Basque Country. He also won the Trofeo Baracchi in 1983 with Daniel Gisiger as well as four stages of the Giro d'Italia.

Major results

1977
 1st Stage 5 Vuelta Ciclista de Chile
 3rd Overall Giro della Valle d'Aosta
1st Stages 2, 4 & 6
1978
 6th Giro dell'Emilia
1979
 1st Giro del Lazio
 1st Gran Piemonte
 2nd Giro di Lombardia
 2nd Trofeo Matteotti
 3rd Overall Giro di Puglia
 3rd Giro dell'Emilia
 3rd Giro dell'Umbria
 3rd Giro del Veneto
 5th Overall Giro d'Italia
1st  Young rider classification
 6th Overall Tour de Romandie
 6th Giro di Romagna
 7th Coppa Placci
1980
 1st GP Industria & Commercio di Prato
 1st Stage 7 Giro d'Italia
 1st Gran Premio Città di Camaiore
 1st Trofeo Matteotti
 1st Overall Cronostaffetta
 2nd Overall Tour de Romandie
1st Stage 3
 2nd Overall Ruota d'Oro
1st Stage 3
 3rd Tre Valli Varesine
 3rd Giro del Veneto
 3rd Coppa Placci
 3rd Giro di Campania
 3rd Milano–Vignola
 4th GP Montelupo
 5th Overall Paris–Nice
 7th GP Industria & Artigianato
 7th Giro di Toscana
 8th Overall Giro di Sardegna
 8th Giro di Lombardia
 8th Giro dell'Emilia
 8th Giro del Lazio
 10th Milano–Torino
 10th Trofeo Laigueglia
1981
 1st  Overall Tour of the Basque Country
1st Stages 3, 4 & 5b
 1st  Overall Deutschland Tour
 1st Stage 1 Paris–Nice 
 3rd Giro dell'Emilia
 3rd Giro del Veneto
 3rd Trofeo Pantalica
 4th Overall Giro d'Italia
 4th Coppa Ugo Agostoni
 4th Giro dell'Appennino
 4th Trofeo Laigueglia
 10th Züri-Metzgete
1982
 1st Liège–Bastogne–Liège
 1st Coppa Bernocchi
 1st Visp–Grächen
 1st Stage 7a Tour of Sweden
 2nd Giro dell'Emilia
 3rd Overall Giro d'Italia
1st Stages 6 & 17
 3rd Overall Tour de Romandie
 3rd GP Industria & Artigianato
 4th Overall Setmana Catalana de Ciclisme
1st Stages 3 & 4
 4th Giro di Romagna
 6th Coppa Ugo Agostoni
 7th Milan–San Remo
 8th Gent–Wevelgem
 9th GP de Fourmies
 10th Overall Tirreno–Adriatico
1983
 1st Trofeo Baracchi (with Daniel Gisiger)
 1st Giro del Lazio
 1st Stage 1 (TTT) Giro d'Italia
 2nd Tre Valli Varesine
 5th Paris–Tours
 6th GP Industria & Commercio di Prato
1984
 1st Coppa Sabatini
 2nd Road race, National Road Championships
 3rd Giro dell'Umbria
 6th Overall Tour Méditerranéen
 6th Giro dell'Etna
 9th Giro di Lombardia
 10th Overall Settimana Internazionale di Coppi e Bartali
1985
 1st  Overall Grand Prix du Midi Libre
1st Stage 1
 1st  Overall Tour de l'Aude
1st Stage 1
 1st Overall Giro di Puglia
 1st Overall Ruota d'Oro
 1st Coppa Placci
 2nd Overall Giro del Trentino
 6th Giro di Lombardia
 7th Overall Giro d'Italia
 7th Overall Tirreno–Adriatico
 8th Firenze–Pistoia
1986
 4th Grand Prix de Wallonie
1987
 1st Giro dell'Umbria
 3rd Trofeo Pantalica
 5th Coppa Placci
 6th Overall Settimana Internazionale di Coppi e Bartali
 9th Overall Route du Sud
1988
 1st Overall Trofeo dello Scalatore
1st Stage 3
 2nd Giro di Toscana
 5th Giro dell'Emilia
 9th Tre Valli Varesine
 9th Overall Giro del Trentino
 10th Coppa Placci
1989
 2nd Overall Vuelta a Murcia
1st Stage 5a

Grand Tour general classification results timeline

References

External links

1958 births
Living people
Italian male cyclists